Chlorida denticulata is a species of beetle in the family Cerambycidae. It was described by Buquet in 1860. It's known distribution is in Guyana, French Guiana, and Ecuador. Known host plants include Eperua rubiginosa, Ormosia paraensis, Hevea guianensis.

References

Bothriospilini
Beetles described in 1860